Danijel Stojković (Serbian Cyrillic: Данијел Стојковић; born 14 August 1990) is a Serbian football defender.

Career
Stojković started his career in BSK Borča youth selection.

Experience is gained on Serbian League fields during several years as performer of FK PKB Padinska Skela.

He moved to Voždovac for season 2012–13.

References

External links
 Danijel Stojković at jelenfootball.com
 

1990 births
Living people
Footballers from Belgrade
Association football defenders
Serbian footballers
FK Voždovac players
FK BSK Borča players
OFK Beograd players
FK Radnik Surdulica players
FC Alashkert players
FC Neman Grodno players
FC Atyrau players
FK Neftchi Farg'ona players
Serbian First League players
Serbian SuperLiga players
Armenian Premier League players
Serbian expatriate footballers
Expatriate footballers in Armenia
Expatriate footballers in Belarus
Expatriate footballers in Kazakhstan
Expatriate footballers in Uzbekistan
Serbian expatriate sportspeople in Armenia